UF Health Shands Cancer Hospital is an academic cancer center in Gainesville, Florida. The 200 bed complex focuses on producing basic laboratory findings that will ultimately be used for preventive therapies for cancers.

Background
The facility houses about 200 private inpatient beds for a variety of patients, including those receiving diagnostic and therapeutic oncology services. It also includes a Critical Care Center for emergency and trauma related services. Designed by Flad Architects and built by SkanskaUSA, construction was completed in 2009 and cost $388 million.

See also
 University of Florida
 Shands at the University of Florida
 University of Florida College of Medicine
 J. Hillis Miller Health Science Center
 Buildings at the University of Florida

References

External links
UF Health
UF Health Shands Cancer Hospital
UF Health Cancer Center

Hospital buildings completed in 2006
Teaching hospitals in Florida
Hospitals in Florida
University of Florida
Buildings and structures in Gainesville, Florida
Cancer hospitals
2006 establishments in Florida